Sydney Sparkes Orr (6 December 1914 - 15 July 1966) was Professor of Philosophy at the University of Tasmania and the centre of the "Orr case", a celebrated academic scandal of the 1950s.

Born in Belfast in 1914, Orr achieved a first-class-honours BA in Philosophy and received an MA with special commendation at Queen's University before commencing his teaching career at the University of St Andrews and the University of Melbourne. In 1952 he was appointed to the chair of philosophy at the University of Tasmania, after falsifying his academic record in his application.

In 1955 the University dismissed him for sexual relations with an undergraduate student. He denied the accusation but his appeals to the Tasmanian Supreme Court and the High Court of Australia were unsuccessful. Many academics believed Orr had been denied due process and his position was declared "black". Many also thought that Orr had been made a scapegoat due to his openly challenging the University authorities. 

References

Sources
W. D. Joske Orr, Sydney Sparkes (1914? - 1966), Australian Dictionary of Biography, Volume 15, Melbourne University Press, 2000, pp 543–544. 
W. H. C. Eddy (1961) Orr, Jacaranda Publishers, Brisbane
John Polya and Robert Solomon (1996) Dreyfus in Australia, Privately Published, Sydney, NSW. 
Clyde Manwell and C. M. Ann Baker (1986) "Not Merely Malice": The University of Tasmania Versus Professor Orr, in Brian Martin, C. M. Ann Baker, Clyde Manwell and Cedric Pugh (eds.), Intellectual Suppression. Australian Case Histories, Analysis and Responses, Angus and Robertson, North Ryde (NSW) pp. 39–49
Cassandra Pybus (1994) Seduction and Consent: A Case of Gross Moral Turpitude, Mandarin, Port Melbourne
J. Franklin (2003) Corrupting the Youth: A History of Philosophy in Australia, Macleay Press, ch. 3
Orr v University of Tasmania(1957) 100 Commonwealth Law Reports 526

Further reading
Davis R The battle for collegiality in Tasmania: The 1955 Royal Commission and the Orr aftermath (Ch.3 of Biggs D & Davis R (eds) The Subversion of Australian Universities, Wollongong 2002
 K. Malpas, 'Orr case' in A Companion to Philosophy in Australia and New Zealand

1914 births
1966 deaths
Writers from Belfast
Alumni of Queen's University Belfast
Academics of the University of St Andrews
Academic staff of the University of Melbourne
Academic staff of the University of Tasmania
Academic sex scandals
20th-century Australian philosophers
20th-century British philosophers
20th-century Irish philosophers
British emigrants to Australia